This article contains a list of all matches played during the 2022 Super Rugby Pacific regular season. On 23 December 2021, a revised draw was announced due to complications surrounding the COVID-19 pandemic. On 20 February, the New Zealand-based Round 2 fixtures were reshuffled to allow  more time to recover, following positive COVID-19 cases in their squad.

Round 1

Round 2

Round 3

Round 4

Round 5

Round 6

Round 7

Round 8

Round 9

Round 10 – ANZAC & Super Round

Round 11

Round 12

Round 13

Round 14

Round 15

See also
 2022 Super Rugby Pacific season

Notes

References

2022 Super Rugby Pacific season
Super Rugby lists